Charlotte Duggan Boyle (August 20, 1899 – October 3, 1990), also known by her married name Charlotte Clune, was an American competition swimmer and world record-holder.  Boyle represented the United States at the 1920 Summer Olympics in Antwerp, Belgium, where she competed in the women's 100-meter freestyle.  She was a former world record-holder in the 200-meter freestyle, and also set U.S. records in the now-forgotten plunge for distance event.

Boyle was inducted into the International Swimming Hall of Fame as an "Honor Pioneer Swimmer" in 1988.

See also
 List of members of the International Swimming Hall of Fame
 World record progression 200 metres freestyle

References

External links

 
  Charlotte Boyle (USA) – Honor Pioneer Swimmer profile at the International Swimming Hall of Fame

1899 births
1990 deaths
American female freestyle swimmers
World record setters in swimming
Olympic swimmers of the United States
Swimmers from Honolulu
Sportspeople from New York City
Swimmers at the 1920 Summer Olympics
20th-century American women